Chinteni is a commune in Cluj County, Transylvania, Romania. It is composed of nine villages: Chinteni, Deușu (Diós), Feiurdeni (Fejérd), Măcicașu (Magyarmacskás), Pădureni (Fejérdi fogadók), Săliștea Veche (Szellőcskevölgy), Sânmărtin (Szentmártonmacskás), Satu Lung (Hosszúmacskás) and Vechea (Bodonkút).

Demographics

According to the 2011 census, Romanians made up 77.0% of the population, Hungarians made up 17.7% and Roma made up 0.6%.

Villages

Vechea
Vechea is a village in Chinteni commune, with a population of 2075 people (2002). The village population is mostly Romanian, along with a few Hungarian families.

History
Vechea has a long attested history of more than 2000 years. Under the direction of professor Vasile Suciu, a small museum was set up  at the local school, with artifacts discovered in the area. These artifacts attest the long history of human life in that part of the world.

Geography
There are 3 churches in Vechea, two Orthodox and one Calvinist. One of the Orthodox church was built in 1726, a marvel of wood architecture, conserving most of its original structure.

Vechea is divided from Deuşu village only by the national road from Cluj-Napoca to Vultureni-Borşa.

Feiurdeni
Feiuredni has a long history as well. Until the 1980s it had a high population, but the growing industry in the nearby Cluj-Napoca combined with a difficult commute resulted in a massive migration of the young families to the city. At one point the regular bus between the village and the city was cut off. Nowadays it's a reverse phenomenon people are moving back in the village. The causes are thin time the low price of houses and the high cost of living in the city for the lower income families.

Feiurdeni has a Roma (Gypsy) community concentrated in the Buna quarter of the village. Numerous back in time they moved in the city in the last decade of the communist regime, now are moving back in the village where life is no so expensive as in the city.

History
Feiurdeni is a farming village. Most of the families are living from agriculture. Before the communist reign, the village was producing milk and dairy products for the nearby city. The tradition last during the communism, few families managed to live from the free trade of dairy products, an example is the Ratiu family (known as Sigo).

During the Second World War the hills around the village were disputed in a violent battle between the Soviet and the German armies.

The Orthodox Church has a Roman architecture, having as its model a Swiss Calvinist Church.

References
Atlasul localităților județului Cluj (Cluj County Localities Atlas), Suncart Publishing House, Cluj-Napoca

Notes

Communes in Cluj County
Localities in Transylvania